"Sound and Vision" is a song by David Bowie.

Sound and Vision, Sound & Vision and Sound + Vision may also refer to:

Other David Bowie media
 Sound + Vision (box set), a David Bowie box set
 Sound+Vision Tour, a David Bowie concert tour
 David Bowie: Sound and Vision (documentary), a David Bowie documentary film

Other music
 Sounds and Visions, an album by The Earl Klugh Trio 
 Greatest Hits: Sound & Vision , a greatest hits album by Blondie

Companies
 Sound & Vision (magazine), a home electronics and entertainment magazine
 Sound & Vision India, an Indian dubbing studio
 Netherlands Institute for Sound and Vision, an audio-visual archive of Dutch television, radio, music and film